Randall Island (formerly Hensley Island) is an island in the Sacramento River, in the Sacramento–San Joaquin River Delta. It is part of Sacramento County, California, and managed by Reclamation District 755. It is shown, labelled "Hensley Island", on an 1850 survey map of the San Francisco Bay area made by Cadwalader Ringgold and an 1854 map of the area by Henry Lange.

References

Islands of Sacramento County, California
Islands of the Sacramento–San Joaquin River Delta
Islands of Suisun Bay
Islands of Northern California